FK Jiskra Třeboň is a Czech football club located in Třeboň. It currently plays in Divize A in the Czech Fourth Division. The club has participated numerous times in the Czech Cup, reaching the third round in 2006–07 and 2007–08.

References

External links
  

Football clubs in the Czech Republic
Association football clubs established in 1884
Jindřichův Hradec District